The Ternate–Nasugbu Road, also known as Ternate–Nasugbu Highway or Nasugbu–Ternate Highway, is a two-to-four lane, secondary road in the provinces of Cavite and Batangas, Philippines. It connects the municipality of Ternate in Cavite to the municipality of Nasugbu in Batangas.

The road forms part of National Route 407 (N407) of the Philippine highway network. It is also locally known as J.P. Laurel Street in Nasugbu.

Route description 

From the south, the road starts at the intersection with Tagaytay–Nasugbu Road and Nasugbu–Lian–Calatagan Road in Nasugbu as the continuation of the latter. It traverses the municipal proper of Nasugbu as J.P. Laurel Street. Running parallel to the western coast of Batangas and Cavite, it turns north in Barangay Looc before traversing the Mounts Palay-Palay–Mataas-na-Gulod Protected Landscape, where it enters the province of Cavite at Maragondon. The road ends at its intersection with Caylabne Road in Ternate and continues towards the town proper as Governor's Drive.

History 
The road originated as a first-class road in Nasugbu linking Batangas–Bauan–Nasugbu Road, particularly the section now part of Tagaytay–Nasugbu Road, to Barangay Wawa.  It was later extended north towards Ternate through a project conceived in 1994 during the administration of President Fidel V. Ramos. However, the construction was delayed due to right-of-way issues, with the groundbreaking held in 2009 during the administration of President Gloria Macapagal Arroyo and completed in 2013 during the administration of President Benigno Aquino III. The project includes a  paved road, a  concrete road, four new bridges, and the  Kaybiang Tunnel.

Intersections

References

External links 
 Department of Public Works and Highways

Roads in Cavite
Roads in Batangas